KBMY (channel 17) is a television station in Bismarck, North Dakota, United States, affiliated with ABC and MyNetworkTV. Owned by Forum Communications Company, the station maintains a news bureau and advertising sales office on North 15th Street in Bismarck, and its transmitter is located near St. Anthony, North Dakota.

Although identifying as a separate station in its own right, KBMY is considered a semi-satellite of sister station and company flagship WDAY-TV (channel 6) in Fargo, which operates semi-satellite WDAZ-TV (channel 8) in Grand Forks. Internal operations are housed at WDAY-TV's studios on South 8th Street in Fargo. KBMY clears all network programming as provided through its parent WDAY-TV and simulcasts WDAY-TV's newscasts, but airs a separate offering of syndicated programming; there are also separate commercial inserts and legal station identifications.

KMCY (channel 14) in Minot, North Dakota operates as a semi-satellite of KBMY extending the ABC/MyNetworkTV signal into the northern half of the Bismarck–Minot market; this station's news bureau and advertising sales office are located on 2nd St SE in Minot, and its transmitter is located near South Prairie. KMCY simulcasts all network and syndicated programming as provided through KBMY but airs separate local commercial inserts and legal identifications.

History
KBMY signed on for the first time on March 31, 1985, and KMCY signed on for the first time in June 1985; bringing the full ABC schedule to central and western North Dakota and eastern Montana for the first time ever. Before 1985, this area had been one of the last in the United States without full network service. ABC was limited to off-hours clearances on KX Television (KXMC/KXMD/KXMB/KXMA) and Meyer Television (KFYR/KQCD/KMOT/KUMV). From the 1970s onward, some cable subscribers in western North Dakota received ABC programming from KULR-TV (now NBC) from Billings, KFBB-TV from Great Falls, KOTA-TV from Rapid City or KUSA in Denver. The eastern half of the market was served by Fargo's KTHI-TV (now KVLY-TV) until it swapped affiliations with WDAY/WDAZ in 1983. From 1983 onward, cable systems in Bismarck piped in WDAY-TV, while cable systems in Minot piped in WDAZ.

On paper, western North Dakota had been large enough to support three full network affiliates since at least the late 1960s. However, this region is one of the largest geographic markets in the nation, spilling across large slices of North Dakota, Montana, and South Dakota. It is so vast that KX Television and Meyer Television both need four full-power stations to adequately cover it. On paper, the FCC collapsed central and western North Dakota into one giant market in 1957. However, the market was not fully realized until 1980, when Meyer upgraded its low-powered translator in Dickinson to a full-powered station, prompting Dickinson's original station, KDIX-TV (now KXMA) to become a separately-owned satellite of KX Television. Additionally, the only available commercial allocations were on the UHF band; UHF stations have never covered large areas very well. By the early 1980s, cable television—a must for acceptable television in much of this vast market—had gained enough penetration for a network affiliate on the UHF band to be viable.

In the early 2000s, KBMY signed on two low-powered translators to serve the smaller cities in the market, K44HR in Williston and K42FY in Dickinson. Prior to K44HR's inception, cable systems in Williston, Dickinson and the western half of the market piped in Denver's ABC affiliate—KUSA prior to 1995 and KMGH-TV after 1995. The Dickinson station directly repeated KBMY, while the Williston station repeated KMCY.

From the 1990s until 2007, KBMY and KMCY were known collectively as ABC West. That year, the stations changed their monikers in favor of the station identities for their area. From 2002 until 2008, KBMY/KMCY was operated by Prime Cities Broadcasting, owner of western North Dakota's Fox affiliate, KNDX/KXND, in a local marketing agreement. The LMA allowed KBMY/KMCY to share the facilities, staff, and some equipment of KNDX/KXND.

The LMA with KNDX/KXND ended in 2008, with Forum opting to partner with Reiten Television in KBMY/KMCY's local operations via a joint sales agreement. While some local advertising staffers were based at KXMB-TV in Bismarck and KXMC-TV in Minot, most operations have been consolidated at WDAY-TV's studios in Fargo. 

Under this arrangement, KBMY and KMCY's programming was transported from WDAY-TV's studios to Bismarck via leased microwave relay bandwidth furnished by Prairie Public Broadcasting's statewide digital terrestrial microwave network (the only permanent full-time video link from Fargo to Bismarck for television broadcasting). The signal was then sent to KXMB from Prairie Public via fiber-optic line, where it then is exported via a studio to transmitter link (STL) from KXMB's studios to KBMY and KMCY's transmitters.

As part of the JSA with Reiten, KBMY/KMCY were picked up on the digital subchannels of KX Television satellites KXMA-TV in Dickinson and KXMD-TV in Williston starting in May 2009, and the translators serving Dickinson and Williston were shut down. The JSA was terminated following the acquisition of the KX stations by Nexstar Broadcasting Group on February 2, 2016. At the same time, the ABC subchannels of KXMA and KXMD were replaced with The CW Plus. Due to the high penetration of cable and satellite in this market, however, few viewers in the western part of the market lost access to ABC programming.

WDAY Xtra
WDAY Xtra is a digital subchannel carried on WDAY 6.3, WDAZ 8.3, KBMY 17.3, and KMCY 14.3, airing as a primary affiliation to MyNetworkTV on KBMY and KMCY but independent without interruption on WDAY-TV and WDAZ-TV. This subchannel airs syndicated programming, North Dakota and Minnesota high school sports, North Dakota high school state tournaments, Minnesota State University Moorhead athletics, and select University of North Dakota athletic events. It airs Doppler weather radar and "Storm Tracker" weather loop with easy listening music during overnights.

WDAY Xtra became available in HD in 2014, and in 2016, MyNetworkTV programming began airing (in prime time), although on KBMY and KMCY only (in Bismarck and Minot respectively) but not on WDAY-TV in Fargo or WDAZ-TV in Devils Lake/Grand Forks (the most likely reason being that both of those stations broadcast to a viewing area that is currently being serviced by MyNetworkTV affiliate KRDK-TV from Valley City/Fargo).

Starting on August 29, 2016, WDAY Xtra and the Justice Network aired WDAY Xtra News during weekdays at 9:00 p.m. It is offered on Midco cable channel 594. KBMY and KMCY began carrying this subchannel in 2013.

News and programming

When KBMY/KMCY signed on in 1985, the stations originated and aired a local newscast with on-location ENG and studio news coverage for the Bismarck and Minot areas. However, despite Forum's resources and legacy in North Dakota (sister stations WDAY/WDAZ are among the strongest ABC affiliates in the nation), KBMY/KMCY made almost no headway against Meyer Television and KX Television. Forum shelved this first attempt at a local newscast in March 1989 due to concerns about costs, with the nationally syndicated USA Today: The Television Show occupying the 10:00 p.m. newscast's former timeslot in KBMY/KMCY's schedule.

For the next quarter-century, the stations were among the few Big Three affiliates in the nation with no long form newscasts. From the mid-1990s to 2014, the closest thing to a newscast on the stations was Good Morning West Dakota, a 30-minute morning show produced by Bismarck radio station KBMR. Even then, there were no local cut-ins during Good Morning America.

Starting in 2014, WDAY-TV began reorienting its newscasts to a statewide focus, and gradually began simulcasting them on KBMY/KMCY. The Sunday 5:30 p.m. (Central Time) newscast was the first rolled out to Bismarck, in February 2014. First News broadcasts during weekday mornings from 5:00 a.m. to 7:00 a.m. (Central Time) debuted in April 2014, and the stations began airing WDAY's 5:00 p.m. (Central Time) weekday newscast in August 2014. Local cut-ins during Good Morning America are broadcast from WDAY-TV's studios. WDAY's 6 p.m. newscast debuted on September 14, 2015 with the 10 p.m. news starting on December 5, 2016.

The stations do not produce much local content, mostly serving as "pass-throughs" for automated programming from ABC and WDAY/WDAZ.

KBMY and KMCY sign off on Monday mornings at 4:30 a.m., returning to the air just minutes later.

Syndicated programming on KBMY/KMCY includes Live with Kelly and Ryan, Family Feud, Tamron Hall, Judge Judy and Entertainment Tonight among others. KBMY/KMCY is one of a few ABC affiliates to air paid programming on weekdays.

Technical information

Subchannels
The stations' digital signals are multiplexed:

Analog-to-digital conversion
KBMY shut down its analog signal, over UHF channel 17, on June 12, 2009, the official date in which full-power television stations in the United States transitioned from analog to digital broadcasts under federal mandate. The station "flash-cut" its digital signal into operation on UHF channel 17.

KMCY shut down its analog signal, over UHF channel 14, on February 10, 2009, and "flash-cut" its digital signal into operation on UHF channel 14.

References

ABC network affiliates
True Crime Network affiliates
MyNetworkTV affiliates
Ion Television affiliates
Defy TV affiliates
TrueReal affiliates
Forum Communications Company
Television channels and stations established in 1985
BMY
1985 establishments in North Dakota